John Ronald Thomas known as Ron Thomas M.B.E., was a Welsh international lawn and indoor bowler.

Bowls career
Thomas made his debut for Wales indoors in 1955 and outdoors in 1960.

He finished runner-up to David Bryant in the 1981 World Indoor Bowls Championship in Coatbridge.

He is twice a Welsh National Champion, winning the fours in 1963 & 1969, when bowling for the Barry Athletic Bowls Club. He also won the British Isles Bowls Championships fours title in 1964.

During the 1984/85 season he was the President of the Welsh Indoor Bowling Association. and received the MBE in the 1994 Birthday Honours as President of the Welsh Association of Visually Handicapped Bowlers for services to Bowling and to People with Disabilities.

References

Welsh male bowls players
1928 births
Year of death missing